The third round of OFC matches for 2018 FIFA World Cup qualification began on 7 November 2016 and ended on 5 September 2017.

Format
A total of six teams which had advanced from the OFC Nations Cup (second round) were drawn into two groups of three teams to play home-and-away round-robin matches. The winners of each group advanced to the OFC Final, played home-and-away over two legs, and the winners of the final advanced to the inter-confederation play-offs.

Qualified teams

Seeding
The draw for the third round was held on 8 July 2016, 11:00 NZST (UTC+12), at the OFC headquarters in Auckland, New Zealand.

The seeding was based on the results of the 2016 OFC Nations Cup (second round):
The OFC Nations Cup champions (New Zealand) and runners-up (Papua New Guinea) were seeded as A1 and B1 respectively.
Pot 1 contained the OFC Nations Cup losing semi-finalists (New Caledonia and Solomon Islands).
Pot 2 contained the third-placed teams of the OFC Nations Cup group stage (Fiji and Tahiti).

Each group contained a seeded team, a team from Pot 1, and a team from Pot 2. The same group compositions as the OFC Nations Cup were not allowed by the draw (i.e., Papua New Guinea, New Caledonia and Tahiti in one group, New Zealand, Solomon Islands and Fiji in the other group). The fixtures of each group were confirmed by the OFC after the draw, taking into account the need for New Zealand to have a bye in June 2017 for playing in the 2017 FIFA Confederations Cup, and Papua New Guinea to have a bye in November 2016 for hosting the 2016 FIFA U-20 Women's World Cup.

Note: Bolded teams qualified for the inter-confederation play-offs. Italicised teams qualified for the OFC final but lost.

Group stage

Group A

Group B

Final
The draw for the final (which decided the order of legs) was held on 15 June 2017, 16:00 NZST (UTC+12), at the OFC headquarters in Auckland, New Zealand.

The winners of the final advanced to inter-confederation play-offs. Dates were set for the two-legged final as being on 1 and 5 September 2017.

New Zealand won 8–3 on aggregate and advanced to the inter-confederation play-offs.

Goalscorers
There were 41 goals scored in 14 matches, for an average of  goals per match.

4 goals

 Chris Wood

3 goals

 Marco Rojas
 Ryan Thomas
 Henry Fa'arodo

2 goals

 Mone Wamowe
 Patrick Aisa
 Raymond Gunemba
 Micah Lea'alafa
 Sylvain Graglia
 Tauhiti Keck

1 goal

 Roy Krishna
 Epeli Saukuru
 Saula Waqa
 Emile Ounei
 Richard Sele
 Kosta Barbarouses
 Myer Bevan
 Michael McGlinchey
 Nigel Dabinyaba
 Michael Foster
 Jerry Donga
 Atkin Kaua
 Emmanuel Poila
 Benjamin Totori
 Teaonui Tehau

1 own goal
 Hadisi Aengari (against New Zealand)

Notes

References

External links

Qualifiers – Oceania: Round 3, FIFA.com
2018 FIFA World Cup Russia Qualifiers – OFC Stage 3, oceaniafootball.com

3
2016–17 in OFC football
2017–18 in OFC football